CdO may refer to:
Cagayan de Oro
Cadmium oxide